'Fire Chariot of Destruction is the ninth full length studio album by the Polish black metal band Graveland. It was released on No Colours Records in 2005. An LP version was also released and was limited to 1000 copies.

Track listing
 "War Wolf" - 10:18
 "River of Tears" - 7:24
 "Fire Chariot of Destruction" - 6:35
 "Flaming Wrathful Hate" - 7:38
 "Creator and Destroyer" - 6:59
 "Prayer for My Ancestors" - 8:06
 "Dance of Axes and Swords" - 7:00
 "Motherland" - 6:47

Personnel
 Rob Darken - all instruments, vocals, songwriting and lyrics

Additional personnel
 Christophe Szpajdel - logo

2005 albums
Graveland albums